The Gold Collar is a greyhound racing competition held annually. It was inaugurated in 1933 at Catford Stadium.

Following the closure of Catford in 2003 the competition switched to Belle Vue Stadium but only lasted until 2009 when it was discontinued. Six years later the competition was resurrected by Crayford Stadium.

Past winners

Venues & Distances 
1933–1933	(Catford 400y)
1934–1935 	(Catford 540y)
1936–1962 	(Catford 440y)
1963–1971 	(Catford 570y)
1972–1974 	(Catford 610y)
1975–2003 	(Catford 555m)
2004–2004	(Belle Vue 647m)
2005–2005	(Belle Vue 465m)
2006–2009 	(Belle Vue 590m)
2015–present	(Crayford 540m)

Sponsors
1994–1994 (John Humphreys Bookmakers)
1998–1998 (BT Global Finance)
2004–2009 (Totesport)
2015––present (Ladbrokes)

References

Greyhound racing competitions in the United Kingdom
Sport in the London Borough of Bexley
Sport in the London Borough of Lewisham
Recurring sporting events established in 1933
Greyhound racing in London
Sports competitions in Manchester